Guma (Goma) Town, also known as Pishan Town (Chinese: 皮山镇, Pinyin: Píshān; written 皮亢, Pikang in the Weilüe), is an ancient oasis town on the main caravan route between Khotan and Karghalik and, in Han times, the route left from here to go to Arachosia (Kandahar) through Hunza. It is located in the Taklamakan Desert, in the Xinjiang Uyghur Autonomous Region of the People's Republic of China, about 158 km southeast of Kashgar in modern Xinjiang, China.

The Hanshu (which describes events up to 23 CE) mentions that it had 500 households, 3,500 individuals and 500 persons able to bear arms. It was an important hub for caravans heading south to India over the Karakorum route or through the Pamirs to Jalalabad or Badakhshan.

Today, Pishan is a small, rather poor town of about 2,000 people. The main crop is cotton. Most of the inhabitants are Uyghur and there are some Tajiks.

Transportation
Pishan is served by China National Highway 315 and the Kashgar-Hotan Railway.

See also
 Silk Road transmission of Buddhism

Footnotes

References
Hill, John E. 2004. The Peoples of the West from the Weilüe 魏略 by Yu Huan 魚豢: A Third Century Chinese Account Composed between 239 and 265 CE. Draft annotated English translation.
Hill, John E. (2009) Through the Jade Gate to Rome: A Study of the Silk Routes during the Later Han Dynasty, 1st to 2nd Centuries CE. BookSurge, Charleston, South Carolina. .
Hulsewé, A. F. P. 1979. China in Central Asia: The Early Stage 125 BC – AD 23: an annotated translation of chapters 61 and 96 of the History of the Former Han Dynasty. E. J. Brill, Leiden. .
Roerich, George N. (1931): Trails to Inmost Asia: Five Years of Exploration with the Roerich Central Asian Expedition. Roerich. First Indian Reprint. Book Faith India, Delhi. 1996.

External links
Satellite picture of Pishan
Silk Road Seattle (The Silk Road Seattle website contains many useful resources including a number of full-text historical works)

Populated places in Xinjiang
Oases of China
Populated places along the Silk Road